Keith Almgren, is a pseudonym for Gunnar Almgren, born Almgren Johansson 8 November 1957 in Järfälla, Sweden, is a Swedish songwriter and music publisher.

Keith Almgren has a solid background and has written over 1400 titles in the register of STIM.

Keith Almgren has for example participated many times with several songs in the Swedish part of the Eurovision Song Contest as music publisher but also as songwriter. For example, he participated the Eurovision Song Contest as music publisher for Roger Pontare with "When spirits are calling my name" 2000 in the Melodifestivalen in Stockholm and was publisher for Take me to your heaven which won the Swedish contest with Charlotte Nilsson and also won the European Song Contest in Jerusalem 1999.

Keith Almgren wrote the lyrics "ABC" for Anna Book 1986 and "Jag har en dröm" (in English "I have a dream") for Baden Baden in the Swedish part of the Eurovision Song Contest.

Keith Almgren is the owner of Sweden Songs (Music Publishing Company). He has worked at Stim, at a record company, a music publishing company (Scandinavian Songs), at the record companies distribution branch, in record shop, as manager, artist coach and freelance music writer and radio presenter and he also teaches music students in music industry knowledge.

References
Biography Skap (eng. Swedish composers of popular music)

STIM

Sources

SKAP Biography Keith Almgren Swedish Composers of Popular Music
SKAP Members Swedish Composers of Popular Music
Article
Article
STIM

External links
Bio Keith Almgren Sweden Songs Official Website

1957 births
Living people
People from Järfälla Municipality
Swedish songwriters
Swedish composers
Swedish male composers